The mixed doubles of the tournament 2022 BWF World Junior Championships is an individual badminton tournament to crowned the best mixed doubles under 19 pair across the BWF associate members around the world. Players will compete to win the Eye Level Cup presented by the former BWF President and chairman of the World Youth Culture Foundation, Kang Young Joong. The tournament will be held from 24 to 30 October 2022 at the Palacio de Deportes de Santander, Spain. The defending champions were Feng Yanzhe and Lin Fangling from China, but they were not eligible to participate this year.

Seeds 

  Jarne Schlevoigt / Julia Meyer (second round)
  Lucas Renoir / Téa Margueritte (fourth round)
  Hjalte Johansen / Emma Irring Braüner (quarter-finals)
  Maël Cattoen / Camille Pognante (third round)
  Rubén García / Lucía Rodríguez (third round)
  Noah Haase / Kirsten de Wit (second round)
  Keán Gábor Kígyós / Nikol Szabina Vetor (second round)
  Rodrigo Sanjurjo / Nikol Carulla (third round)

  Marwan Faza / Jessica Maya Rismawardani (fourth round)
  Jonathan Dresp / Anna Mejikovskiy (second round)
  Stanimir Terziev / Tsvetina Popivanova (third round)
  Samuel Jones / Estelle van Leeuwen (third round)
  Shunya Ota / Kanano Muroya (second round)
  Jaka Perič Marovt / Anja Jordan (second round)
  Scott Guildea / Sophia Noble (second round)
  Daniel Franco / Elena Payá (second round)

Draw

Finals

Top half

Section 1

Section 2

Section 3

Section 4

Bottom half

Section 5

Section 6

Section 7

Section 8

References

External links 
Draw

2022 BWF World Junior Championships